The Honda S2000 is an open top sports car that was manufactured by Japanese automobile manufacturer Honda, from 1999 until 2009. First shown as a concept car called the SSM at the Tokyo Motor Show in 1995, the production version was launched on April 15, 1999, to celebrate the company's 50th anniversary. The S2000 is named for its engine displacement of two litres, carrying on in the tradition of the S500, S600, and S800 roadsters of the 1960s. 

Several revisions were made throughout the car's production life, including changes to the engine, gearbox, suspension, interior and exterior. Officially two variants exist: the initial launch model was given the chassis code AP1; though cosmetically similar, the facelifted version, known as the AP2 in North America and Japan, incorporated significant changes to the drivetrain and suspension. Production of the S2000 ceased on August 19, 2009.

The Honda S2000 was notable for its exceptional specific power output of about 124 hp per litre, or about two horsepower per cubic inch, the highest of any mass production, naturally aspirated engined car.

The S2000 has since become a legitimate modern classic car, having seen a significant appreciation in price for valued examples in good condition.  In the JDM community and the car community as a whole, the most sought-after models are special edition productions such as the CR (Club Racer) in the USA market; the standard AP1 and AP2 models have achieved collectible status as well.

Concept car

Introduced at the 1995 Tokyo Motor Show, the Honda Sport Study Model concept car was the design study for the production version of the S2000. The SSM was a rear-wheel-drive roadster powered by a  inline four-cylinder engine. It featured a rigid 'high X-bone frame' which Honda claimed improved the vehicle's rigidity and collision safety. The concept car was constructed with aluminum body panels and featured a 50:50 weight distribution.

The SSM appeared in many automotive shows for several years afterwards, hinting at the possibility of a production version, which Honda announced in 1999.

Development
The whole development process has been carried out by Honda designers and engineers. The development team was sticking curiously to the classic Honda values, instead of marketing requirements as former Chief Engineer Shigeru Uehara revealed in an interview: "You will be surprised to know that we had very little input from the marketing people. This was a deliberate move, as we wanted to create something to please us as an engineering team, rather than try and please everyone. If you listen to everyone, included everything they ask for, all cars end up the same. We wanted a vehicle that was more focused - more Honda." 

The development team focused on keeping the compact size and low weight of the concept car according to Uehara:

"The reaction garnered by the SSM meant we had to keep the S2000 as close as possible to the concept car. Using a Civic CRX Del Sol-based mule, it was obvious the packaging was going to be tight, but the early prototype was tried against rival models at Suzuka, and it looked so right, we felt obliged to continue down the same development path." 

The car was tested primarily on race tracks and mountain roads of Japan and Europe, reflecting well the purpose of the roadster: 

"As the project evolved, to make sure we were on the right track, we did a lot of real world testing - first in Hokkaido, and then all over Europe, taking in an average of 450 miles (720 km) a day at high speed. We wanted a car that delivered just the right amount of tension for the driver, with direct and linear response, sharp handling and the necessary power and torque for fast progress and safe overtaking, but nothing too excessive. The final fine-tuning was done on the track to ensure the handling was right without being that sharp that the car became unruly, whatever the weather, followed by more road testing, including a fair bit around the Hakone area. Ultimately, overall driving feel and sound were considered more important than outright speed."

AP1 - 1999–2003

The S2000 was introduced in 1999 for the 2000 model year and was given the chassis designation of "AP1". It features a front engine, rear-wheel-drive layout with power delivered by a  inline four-cylinder DOHC VTEC engine. The engine is mated to a six-speed manual transmission and Torsen limited-slip differential. The S2000 achieved what Honda claimed as the highest specific output of a normally aspirated production automobile engine in the world.

Notable features include independent double wishbone suspension, electrically assisted steering and integrated roll hoops. The car had  wheels with Bridgestone Potenza S-02 tyres equipped. The compact and lightweight engine, mounted entirely behind the front axle, allow the S2000 to achieve a 50:50 front/rear weight distribution and lower rotational inertia. An electrically powered vinyl top with internal cloth lining and plastic rear window was standard, with an aluminum hardtop available as an optional extra (in 2001). Honda initially offered the S2000 in Berlina Black, New Formula Red, Grand Prix White, and Silverstone Metallic exterior colours in the US domestic market.

The 2001 model was largely unchanged; Honda added a digital clock to the radio display and made the rear wind blocker standard. Honda also added Spa Yellow exterior colour to the US domestic market lineup. For the 2002 model year, suspension settings were revised and the plastic rear window was replaced by a glass unit incorporating an electric defroster. Other updates included slightly revised tail lamps with chrome rings, an upgraded radio with separate tweeters, a leather-wrapped gearshift knob, leatherette console cover and a revised engine control unit. Honda added Suzuka Blue Metallic and Sebring Silver Metallic exterior colours to the US domestic market lineup.

The AP1 was manufactured until 2003 at Honda's Takanezawa plant, alongside the NSX and Insight hybrid.

Type V (Japan - 2000)
Honda announced the S2000 Type V on July 7, 2000, in the Japanese domestic market. Notable changes from the standard model include variable gear ratio steering (VGS), a steering system that continuously changes steering ratio based upon vehicle speed and steering angle to provide improved handling as well as more comfortable maneuvering in tight low-speed situations such as parking. It was the first system of its kind to be incorporated into a production car. The lock-to-lock steering ratio was reduced to 1.4 turns (versus 2.4 for the base model). Honda outfitted Type V cars with revised damper units, stabilizers and limited-slip differentials to "complement the VGS". Equipped cars came with a special steering wheel and a VGS badge on the rear. The Type V was retired upon the introduction of the Type S in 2007.

AP2 - 2004–2009

The 2004 model S2000 underwent several significant changes. Production moved to Suzuka. The new model introduced  wheels and Bridgestone RE-050 tyres along with a retuned suspension to reduce oversteer. The spring rates and shock absorber damping were altered and the suspension geometry was modified to improve stability by reducing toe-in changes under cornering loads. The subframe also received a revision in design to achieve high rigidity. In the gearbox the brass synchronizers were replaced with carbon fibre. In addition, cosmetic changes were made to the exterior with new front and rear bumpers, revised headlight assemblies, new LED tail-lights, and oval-tipped exhaust pipes. Although all the cosmetic, suspension and most drivetrain upgrades were included on the Japanese, Australian and European models, they retained the 2.0-litre F20C engines and remained designated as AP1 (facelift) models.

For the North American market, the updates also included the introduction of a larger version of the F20C (with a designation of F22C1); this larger engine gave the new model a chassis designation of AP2. At the same time, the redline and fuel cutoff were reduced from 8,800 rpm and 9,000 rpm to 8,000 rpm and 8,200 rpm respectively, mandated by the longer travel of the pistons. In conjunction with the introduction of the F22C1, Honda also changed the transmission gear ratios by shortening the first five gears and lengthening the sixth.

The F20C continued in all other markets. The 2006 model introduced a drive by wire throttle, an electronic stability control system, new wheels, and one new exterior color, Laguna Blue Pearl. Interior changes included revised seats and additional stereo speakers integrated into the headrests.

Club Racer (U.S. - 2008)

The 2008 model year marked the first time the S2000 was offered in more than one trim level in the United States. In addition to the base model, Honda offered a more track-oriented version of the S2000, distinguished by reduced weight, fewer amenities, and an increase in performance. The S2000 Club Racer made its world debut at the New York International Auto Show on 4 April 2007. Changes for the CR included a lower ratio steering rack, revised exhaust system, black lug nuts, darker colored wheels, clear side markers, stiffer suspension and new Bridgestone Potenza RE070 tyres that were 10mm wider at the rear (255/40R-17 vice the base model's 245/40R-17). A revised body kit, composed of a redesigned front lip, and a large spoiler, were wind-tunnel tested and claimed to reduce the overall coefficient of lift by 70–80%. The power folding soft top was removed and replaced with a Berlina Black hard top (regardless of the car's body paint colour), while the space into which the soft top would normally fold when lowered was filled with additional chassis bracing and topped off with a body-color tonneau cover. Honda also used a CR-unique yellow-lettered spherical aluminum shift knob which rests 12.6 mm lower than the base model's cylindrical shift knob (aluminum/leather wrapped). The CR knob provided a 6 percent reduction in shift stroke, and correspondingly presented a 10 percent higher shift load effort.

CR models were only available with yellow and black Alcantara interiors. Faux carbon fiber overlays on the center console and radio door were unique to the CR trim, as was a peak power indicator light on the instrument gauge cluster, which flashes when the engine is producing its peak power output. To reduce weight and lower the center of gravity, the spare tire was omitted and air conditioning and stereo were offered only as options. Net weight savings without the additional hardtop came to  relative to the standard model. The engine in the S2000 CR was unchanged from the standard trim. Shigeru Uehara, the designer of the S2000, stated that the CR was positioned between the Type S and a hypothetical Type R. However, Honda never made an official Type R S2000 variant.

Production volume of fewer than 2,000 units was expected at launch, and 668 were made for the 2008 model year, representing just over a quarter of the total U.S. production. Honda continued to offer both the standard and CR versions unchanged for the 2009 model year, but with flagging sales caused by the 2008 automotive industry crisis, the S2000 was cancelled mid-model-year. Just 355 U.S. S2000s were manufactured for 2009, of which 31 were CR models. Thus, total CR production over the two model years was 699 units.

Type S (Japan - 2008)

The Japanese domestic market received the Type S edition for the last two years of production (2008–2009). Changes are similar to the U.S. market's CR edition, sharing the weight loss, a purpose built bodykit providing much higher downforce, bespoke wheels and interior. Although it shares the wheels with the CR edition, the Type S retains the rear tyre size of 245/40R-17 for better handling. A specific Type S suspension setup with improved geometry was designed to enhance the handling, the setup is stiffer but more compromising than the CR setup to suit it better to everyday spirited driving and the Japanese touge experience. The Type S retains its soft top folding mechanism.

The interior is a Type S specific yellow and black Alcantara material scheme (similar to the CR). Leather interior from the standard S2000 was available as a no cost option. The aluminum shift knob with reduced shift stroke is shared with the CR. While the CR is designed to be a pure track car, the Type S is designed for improved handling and retains some creature comforts. Only 1,755 units of the Type S were made and sold exclusively in Japan. (2007:168 units, 2008:827 units, 2009:737 units, 2010 [Jan-Jun]:23 units)

GT (U.K. - 2002)
In the United Kingdom, from 2002, the S2000 was offered in both roadster and GT trim. The GT featured a removable hard-top and an outside temperature gauge. On-the-road prices of these trims were £27,300 and £27,850 respectively.

Ultimate Edition and GT Edition 100 (Europe - 2009)
The S2000 Ultimate Edition (continental Europe) and GT Edition 100 (UK market) were limited versions of the S2000 released to commemorate the end of production. Notable changes on both of the cars included Grand Prix White body colour, a removable hard top, graphite-colored alloy wheels with black wheel bolts, aluminium ball gear lever, black S2000 badging and red leather interior with red coloring for stitching on the gear lever gaiter.

The Ultimate Edition was unveiled at the 2009 Geneva Motor Show and went on sale in March 2009. The GT Edition 100 was a limited run of 100 units made specifically for the UK market. In addition to the Ultimate Edition's specification, it features a numbered plaque on the kick-plate indicating which vehicle in the series it is (numbers ranging from 1 to 101. Number 49 was omitted).

Specifications

Notes:
US: United States
EU: Europe
JP: Japan
f: front
r: rear

Reviews and awards

The S2000 has received much praise from critics and motoring journalists and has received favourable reviews from such publications as Car and Driver. Highlighted are the high output of the engine, the high redline, the balanced handling, and the smooth gearbox. User surveys have named the S2000 as a favorite for overall customer satisfaction.
 The S2000 was the Cabrio of the Year at 1999 Geneva International Motor Show where Honda held the roadster's world premiere. 
 The S2000 was on Car and Drivers 10Best list for 2000, 2001, 2002 and 2004.
 The S2000 was the highest-ranked model in the J. D. Power and Associates Vehicle Dependability Study "Premium Sports Car" class for 2004, 2006, and 2008 and consistently held one of the top three positions.
 The S2000 was ranked number #1 in the BBC Top Gear survey in 2003, 2005, and 2006.
 The S2000 was ranked as "Best Affordable Sports Car" by U.S. News & World Report in 2008 and 2009
 The S2000 was on Edmunds Consumers' Most Wanted Vehicles list for 2004, 2005 and 2007.
 The S2000 was one of Jalopnik'''s Best 10 Cars Of The Decade.
 The S2000 was one of Road & Track's Best All-Around Sports Cars.
 The design of the S2000 won the Red Dot Design Award in 2001. 
 The F20C engine of the S2000 was ranked as the best engine respective its size category in the competition "International Engine of the Year" for five consecutive years between 2000 and 2004.
 The F20C engine of the S2000 was one of Ward's 10 Best Engines in 2000 and 2001.

Motorsport

The Honda S2000 has been used in various forms of motorsport. In the Super Taikyu Series, the car has won numerous championships in the ST-4 class and scored class victories at the Tokachi 24 Hours race. It has also won its class at the Nürburgring 24 Hours, and won at the SCCA National Championship Runoffs. The S2000 is popular in autocross and track day events.

In time attack competition, an S2000 modified by Top Fuel set the lap record for rear-wheel drive cars at the Tsukuba Circuit in 2008, which it held for three years. With further modifications, the car produced tuning car lap records at Fuji Speedway, Suzuka Circuit, Okayama International Circuit and Autopolis in 2014 and 2015, while its laptime of 51.762 seconds at Tsukuba set in 2016 ranks among the fastest ever recorded for time attack cars.

In drifting, the S2000 scored several podiums in Formula D during the mid 2000s, including a win at an invitational event at Irwindale, which featured the top 16 drivers from the series' 2004 season. Tetsuya Hibino competed with a 2JZ-powered S2000 in the D1 Grand Prix series between 2017 and 2018, taking a solo run win at the 2017 Tsukuba round.

Sales and production
After several years of steady production, sales of the roadster began falling dramatically starting in 2006, and the trend accelerated during the 2008 automotive industry crisis. In 2008, only 2,538 units were sold in the U.S. - a 74% decline from the 2002 sales peak. In November of that year, for the first time since its launch, only 90 new S2000s were sold nationwide during a calendar month.

Production of the S2000 ceased in June 2009 and plans for a successor were scrapped in the aftermath of the automotive industry crisis; Honda reaffirmed their stance on plans for a successor for the S2000 after patents and trademark filings for what would be the Honda Sports Vision Gran Turismo surfaced in 2015, following the launch of the aforementioned concept car specifically designed for the Gran Turismo'' series. During the 2009 announcement of the vehicle's production end, Honda reported that worldwide sales through the end of 2008 totaled 110,673 units. The final official production figure was 113,889 by the end of 2009. Different sources indicate different sales numbers for Europe, presumably because Honda indicates final numbers including States entered the EU during the production run, but it should be around 19,800-20,700. On the UK market more than 70% of the originally registered cars are still remain, means currently nearly 6,300 cars registered out of 8,500 sold).  

*Note: No new cars were produced in 2010 and 2011; sales represent clearance of residual inventory.Figures are not directly comparable as they are obtained through different methodologies in different markets.

Celebrities driving a Honda S2000 
Celebrities who have or previously had a Honda S2000 sports car: 

 Danica Patrick former NASCAR/IRL racing driver and Go Daddy spokeswoman, 
 Chris Pine actor of Star Trek and Wonder Woman, 
 Jenson Button former Formula 1 and endurance racing driver used several S2000s as his company car, 
 Vicki Butler-Henderson former professional car and motorboat racing driver, journalist and presenter of Top Gear, Fifth Gear, reportedly owned more than one, 
 Bob Dylan songwriter, artist and Nobel Prize Winner, 
 Jason Fenske car journalist and owner of Engineering Explained youtube channel, 
 Graham Rahal IndyCar racing driver and Daytona 24 winner had a Rio Yellow Pearl Club Racer.

References

External links

 Official Honda S2000 sites for the Japan
 

S2000
Roadsters
Euro NCAP roadster sports cars
Rear-wheel-drive vehicles
2000s cars
Cars introduced in 1999
Cars powered by longitudinal 4-cylinder engines